A Flight of Chariots is a 1963 novel written by Australian author Jon Cleary about two friends who fly planes during the Berlin Airlift and Korean War then become involved in the space program.

References

External links
A Flight of Chariots at AustLit (subscription required)

1963 Australian novels
Aviation novels
William Collins, Sons books
William Morrow and Company books
Novels by Jon Cleary